Charles Tory Bruce (May 11, 1906 - December 19, 1971) was a Canadian poet, journalist and fiction writer. He was most noted for his poetry collection The Mulgrave Road, which won the Governor General's Award for English-language poetry or drama at the 1951 Governor General's Awards.

Born in Port Shoreham, Nova Scotia, Bruce graduated from Mount Allison University in 1927. He then joined the Halifax Chronicle, where he worked for eight months before joining Canadian Press. He served as a war correspondent during World War II. In this role, he was presumed missing for several days after accompanying the Royal Air Force into the ill-fated Battle of Arnhem, but was located safe and alive several days later. By 1945, he was general superintendent of the news agency, holding that role until his retirement in 1963.

As a creative writer, he published the poetry collections Wild Apples (1927), Tomorrow's Tide (1932), Personal Note (1941), Grey Ship Moving (1945), The Flowing Summer (1947) and The Mulgrave Road (1951), the novel The Channel Shore (1954) and the short story collection The Township of Time (1959). His poetry also appeared in magazines such as Harper's, Saturday Night, Canadian Poetry and The Saturday Evening Post. Mount Allison University awarded him an Honorary Doctor of Letters in 1952, and the year after his Governor General's Award win he served as a judge in the same category.

His final book, a history of the Southam News company titled News and the Southams, was published in 1968.

He died on December 19, 1971, in Toronto.

Works
 Wild Apples, (1927)
 Tomorrow's Tide, (1932)
 Personal Note, (1941)
 Grey Ship Moving, (1945)
 The Flowing Summer, (1947)
 The Mulgrave Road, (1951)
 The Channel Shore, (1954)
 The Township of Time, (1959)
 News and the Southams, (1968)
 The essential Charles Bruce, (2018) [posthumous]
 
Source:

References

1906 births
1971 deaths
20th-century Canadian poets
20th-century Canadian male writers
20th-century Canadian novelists
21st-century Canadian short story writers
Canadian male poets
Canadian male novelists
Canadian male short story writers
Canadian newspaper journalists
Canadian male journalists
Writers from Nova Scotia
Canadian war correspondents
People from Guysborough County, Nova Scotia